Michigamme is an unincorporated community in Marquette County in the U.S. state of Michigan. It is located within Michigamme Township on the north shores of Lake Michigamme.  For statistical purposes, the United States Census Bureau has defined Michigamme as a census-designated place (CDP). The CDP had a population of 255 at the 2020 census.

The Michigamme ZIP code, 49861, serves a much larger area to the north and west of the lake, including portions of Michigamme Township and Republic Township in Marquette County and Spurr Township and Covington Township in Baraga County.

History
The Michigamme Post Office has been in operation since 1873. The community took its name from nearby Lake Michigamme.

Geography

Demographics

As of the census of 2000, there were 287 people, 138 households, and 94 families residing in the CDP. The racial makeup of the CDP was 99.30% White and 0.70% Native American.

There were 138 households, out of which 19.6% had children under the age of 18 living with them, 60.1% were married couples living together, 6.5% had a female householder with no husband present, and 31.2% were non-families. 28.3% of all households were made up of individuals, and 12.3% had someone living alone who was 65 years of age or older.  The average household size was 2.08 and the average family size was 2.45.

In the CDP, the population was spread out, with 16.4% under the age of 18, 3.5% from 18 to 24, 20.9% from 25 to 44, 37.3% from 45 to 64, and 22.0% who were 65 years of age or older.  The median age was 50 years. For every 100 females, there were 95.2 males.  For every 100 females age 18 and over, there were 96.7 males.

The median income for a household in the CDP was $27,083, and the median income for a family was $33,438. Males had a median income of $30,833 versus $21,250 for females. The per capita income for the CDP was $21,285.  About 5.2% of families and 11.6% of the population were below the poverty line, including 11.6% of those under the age of eighteen and 9.3% of those 65 or over.

Transportation
Indian Trails bus lines operates daily intercity bus service between Hancock and Milwaukee with a stop in Michigamme.  US Highway 41/M-28 passes through the community.

References

External links
Michigamme.com
A historic house in Michigamme

Unincorporated communities in Marquette County, Michigan
Census-designated places in Michigan
Unincorporated communities in Michigan
Census-designated places in Marquette County, Michigan